Iranshahr may refer to:
Ērānshahr or Īrānshahr, the Sasanian Empire
Greater Iran or Iranshahr
Iranshahr (city), a city in the Sistan and Baluchestan Province, Iran
Iranshahr County, a county in the Sistan and Baluchestan Province, Iran
Iranshahr Atash Behram, the holiest Zoroastrian atashkadeh in India
Fahraj, formerly Iranshahr, a city in Kerman Province, Iran
Iran Shahi or Iranshahr, a village in Lorestan Province, Iran
The Parthian province of Nishapur, which also included Sistan

See also
 Iranshah (disambiguation)
Iranshahr High School, a high school in Yazd, Iran
Iran (word)